Žabovřesky is a municipality and village in České Budějovice District in the South Bohemian Region of the Czech Republic. It has about 400 inhabitants.

Administrative parts
The village of Dehtáře is an administrative part of Žabovřesky.

References

Villages in České Budějovice District